Saint Lucia is one of many small land masses composing the insular group known as the Windward Islands. Unlike large limestone areas such as Florida, Cuba, and the Yucatan Peninsula, or the Bahamas, which is a small island group composed of coral and sand, St. Lucia is a typical Windward Island formation of volcanic rock that came into existence long after much of the region had already been formed.

St. Lucia's physical features are notable. Dominated by high peaks and rain forests in the interior, the  island is known for the twin peaks of Gros Pitonand Petit Piton on the southwestern coast, its soft sandy beaches, and its magnificent natural harbors. The steep terrain also accentuates the many rivers that flow from central St. Lucia to the Caribbean. Fertile land holdings, which support banana farming, are scattered throughout the island.

St. Lucia has a tropical, humid climate moderated by northeast trade winds that allow for pleasant year-round conditions. Hurricanes are the most severe climatic disturbance in this area and have been known to cause extensive damage. Although St. Lucia has historically been spared from serious hurricane destruction, Hurricane Allen decimated the agricultural sector and claimed nine lives in 1980. More recently, in 2010, Hurricane Tomas claimed seven lives and also caused extensive agricultural damage, particularly to the island's burgeoning cocoa crop.

General
Saint Lucia is in the Caribbean, an island between the Caribbean Sea and North Atlantic Ocean, north of Saint Vincent and north-west of Barbados. The capital city of Saint Lucia is Castries, where about one third of the population lives. Major towns include Gros Islet, Soufrière and Vieux Fort.

Measurements
 total area: 
 length: 
 width: 
 comparative area: The same as Toronto or 3.5 times the size of Washington, DC
 Coastline:

Maritime claims
 
 contiguous zone: 
 exclusive economic zone: 
 territorial sea:

Climate
Saint Lucia is in the tropical zone, although its climate is moderated by northeast trade winds. Since it is fairly close to the equator, and the surrounding sea surface temperature only fluctuates  3°C (25-28°C) the coastal air temperature does not fluctuate much between winter and summer. The dry season is from December to June, and the rainy season is from June to November.

Terrain
Volcanic and mountainous with some broad, fertile valleys.

Extreme points
 Northernmost point: Pointe du Cap, Gros Islet Quarter, 
 Southernmost point: Ministre Point, Vieux Fort Quarter, 
 Westernmost point: Grande Caille Point, Soufrière Quarter, 
 Easternmost point: Louvet Point, Gros Islet Quarter, 

 lowest point: Caribbean Sea Sea level
 highest point: Mount Gimie elevation:  ,

Natural resources
Saint Lucia has forests, sandy beaches, minerals (pumice), mineral springs, and a geothermal potential.

Land use
About 18% of the land is used for agricultural practices. Most farms consist of less than 5 acres of land. The main agricultural products grown in Saint Lucia are bananas, coconuts, cocoa beans, mangoes, avocados, vegetables, citrus fruits, and root crops such as yams and sweet potatoes. Most of these agricultural products are grown for local consumption, but bananas and coconuts are mainly grown for export, with some vegetables. Bananas occupy about 14,826 acres of the agricultural land, while coconuts occupy 12,400 acres.

Forest reserves and botanical gardens in Saint Lucia:

Castries Waterworks Forest Reserve, 

Dennery Waterworks Forest Reserve, 
Edmond Forest Nature Reserve, 
Frigate Island Nature Reserve, 
Grand Bois Forest Reserve
Maria Island Nature Reserve, 
Quilesse Forest Reserve, 
Savannes Bay Nature Reserve, 
St. Lucia Botanical Gardens (also known as Diamond Botanical Gardens, part of the Soufrière Estate)

Islands

The island of the island nation of Saint Lucia include the following:

Burgot Rocks, 
Dennery Island, 
Des Bateaux Island, 
Fourreur Island, 
Fous Island, 
Frigate Island, 
L'Islet a Ramier, 
Laplins Island, 
Liverpool Rocks, 
Maria Islands, 
Pigeon Island, 
Praslin Island, 
Rat Island, 
Rouche Island (also called Barrel O'Beef), 
Scorpion Island,

Districts

The island of Saint Lucia is divided into 10 Districts and the Forest Reserve:
 Anse la Raye, Leeward Caribbean Sea
 Canaries, Leeward Caribbean Sea
 Castries, Leeward Caribbean Sea
 Choiseul, Leeward Caribbean Sea
 Dennery, Windward Atlantic Ocean
 Grand Bois Forest Reserve, Internal (entrance at )
 Gros Islet, Leeward Caribbean Sea, Windward Atlantic Ocean
 Laborie, Leeward Caribbean Sea
 Micoud, Windward Atlantic Ocean
 Soufrière, Leeward Caribbean Sea
 Vieux Fort, Windward Atlantic Ocean, Leeward Caribbean Sea

Natural hazards
The island country of Saint Lucia is effected by hurricanes and volcanic activity.  The island was severely affected by Hurricane Allen in 1980 and Hurricane Tomas in 2010, causing agricultural damage and a drop in visitor arrivals, but Saint Lucia has generally had fewer hurricanes than many other Caribbean islands, due to its southerly location. Hurricanes and volcanoes would both damage the coral.

Environment

Current issues include deforestation and soil erosion, particularly in the northern region.

Saint Lucia is party to the following treaties and conventions:
Ballast Water Management Convention
Climate Change-Kyoto Protocol
Convention on Biological Diversity
Endangered Species
Environmental Modification Convention
International Convention for the Regulation of Whaling
International Plant Protection Convention
London Convention on the Prevention of Marine Pollution by Dumping of Wastes and Other Matter
United Nations Convention on the Law of the Sea
United Nations Convention to Combat Desertification 
United Nations Framework Convention on Climate Change
Vienna Convention for the Protection of the Ozone Layer

See also
 Districts of Saint  Lucia
 Demographics of Saint Lucia
 Economy of Saint Lucia
 List of rivers of Saint Lucia

References